Rowlan is an Irish Surname and the anglicized version of the name Ó Rothlain .  It, therefore, shares a link with the surnames Rowland, Rowlands, Rollan, Rollin, Rolan, Roland and Rowley.

Rowlan Families in the world

New Zealand

Canterbury
Alister Rowlan of Christchurch, Canterbury, New Zealand is a championship sailer.  He is noted for winning the bronze medal in the 2007 World Sailing Championship for Flying Fifteens, as well as many other awards.

United States

Oklahoma

During the Irish diaspora several members of the Rowlan family from County Mayo, Ireland immigrated to the United States as a direct result of the Great Famine.  They eventually settled in Oklahoma Territory during the Land Run.

See also
 Surname
 O'Rothlain
 Rowland (disambiguation)
 Rowley (disambiguation)
 Irish diaspora
 Oklahoma

References

Irish families
Surnames
Surnames of Irish origin